David Lambert Huffman (April 4, 1957 – November 21, 1998) was an American college and professional football player who was an offensive lineman in the National Football League and United States Football League (USFL) for twelve seasons during the 1970s, 1980s and 1990s.  Huffman played college football for the University of Notre Dame, where he was a member of Notre Dame's 1977 national championship team and an All-American.  He played professionally for the NFL's Minnesota Vikings, and the Memphis Showboats of the USFL.

Early years

Huffman was born in Canton, Ohio.  He graduated from Thomas Jefferson High School in Dallas, Texas, where he was a member of the high school newspaper staff.

College career

He attended the University of Notre Dame, and played for coach Ara Parseghian and coach Dan Devine's Notre Dame Fighting Irish football team from 1975 to 1979.  As a junior, Huffman was a member of the Irish's 1977 national championship squad.  As a senior in 1977, he was recognized as a consensus first-team All-American.  His brothers, Tim and Steve, also played for Notre Dame.  He was noted for his good humor, which included saying that during games he always wore red-colored elbow pads so that his mother could see where he was in the pile-ups.

Professional career

In 1984 and 1985, he also played for the USFL's Arizona Wranglers and Memphis Showboats. In his eleven NFL seasons, he played in 128 games.

Death

Huffman died in a car accident November 21, 1998, while on his way to the final Notre Dame home game of the season vs. LSU.  He was survived by his wife, Cathy, a daughter, Jessica, and a son, Jack.  Each year, the city of Chanhassen, Minnesota, where Huffman served as a Park & Recreation Commissioner after his playing days, hosts a Dave Huffman Memorial 5,000-meter run.

References

1957 births
1998 deaths
All-American college football players
American football offensive linemen
Memphis Showboats players
Minnesota Vikings announcers
Minnesota Vikings players
National Football League announcers
Notre Dame Fighting Irish football players
Sportspeople from Canton, Ohio
Players of American football from Canton, Ohio
Road incident deaths in Indiana
Thomas Jefferson High School (Dallas) alumni